The Kesagami River is a river in northern Cochrane District in Northeastern Ontario, Canada. It is part of the James Bay drainage basin, and is a left tributary of the Harricana River.

The river begins at an unnamed lake in the Abitibi Uplands just west of Ontario Highway 652 and flows north to the large Kesagami Lake. It exits the lake at the northeast, continues north and descends rapidly to the James Bay Lowlands, where it takes in several tributaries before reaching its mouth at the Harricana River, just upstream of that river's mouth at James Bay.

From Kesagami Lake downstream, the river can be traversed as a canoe route.

Tributaries
Shonaniwau Creek (left)
Kapichilewau Creek (left)
Lawagamau River (right)
Kwastigam Creek (left)
Kachigaskotik Creek (left)
Seal River (right)
Little Seal River (right)
Shashiskau River (right)
Bodell River (left)
Kesagami Lake
Wikweyau Creek (right)
Little Kesagami River (right)

See also
List of rivers of Ontario

References

Sources

External links

Rivers of Cochrane District